Mehmet Yıldırım (born 13 December 1948) is a Turkish alpine skier. He competed in three events at the 1968 Winter Olympics.

References

1948 births
Living people
Turkish male alpine skiers
Olympic alpine skiers of Turkey
Alpine skiers at the 1968 Winter Olympics
People from Sarıkamış
20th-century Turkish people